Srinatha ( – 1441) was a well-known 15th-century Telugu poet who popularised the Prabandha style of composition.

Biography
Srinatha was born in Telugu Niyogi Brahmin family in Kalapatam village on Gudur Mandal in Krishna district to parents Bhimamba and Marayya in 1365/1370 

Srinatha was respected as Kavi Sarvabhouma (King of poets) in Telugu, and patronised by many kings. Srinatha worked as a minister in the court of Pedakomati Vema Reddy of Kondaveedu. He managed to get his king's prestigious knife Nandikanta Potaraju Katari which was taken away by Lingamanedu ruler of Devarakanda in return for his literary prowess. Srinatha produced and dedicated a host of books to kings and enjoyed a luxurious life. However, he seemed to have suffered from poverty at the end of his life. Srinatha died in 1441, after the conquest of Coastal Andhra by Kapileswara Gajapati.

He was not the brother-in-law of another famous Telugu poet Potana as shown in the movies.

Works
Srinatha wrote, Panditaaradhyacharita, Sivaratri Mahatyam, Haravilāsamu, Bhimakanda, Kasikhandamu, Srungara Naishadham, Palanati Veeracharitra, Dhananjaya Vijjayam, Marrutaratcharithra, Srungaradipika and Kridabhiramam over the subjects of history and mythology. He translated Salivahana Gatha Saptasati in to Telugu from Prakrit.

Style
Prabandha can be described as a story in verse form with a tight metrical structure. Srinatha's Srungara Naishadhamu is a well-known example of the form.

He is also credited with hundreds of extempore poems called Chatuvulu in Telugu.

Moreover, Srinath was considered popular for his composition of the Seesa Meter in his books, where most part of his eloquent poetry is written in.

Awards and Titles
He was widely regarded as the Kavi Sarvabhouma (The emperor among poets). He had broken the drum of Gouda Dimdimabhattu in the court of Vijayanagara during the reign of Proudhadevarayulu, by his incredible skill of conversing. He was honoured with gold for his dexterity in the Telugu literature by the king.

In popular culture
A biographical film on Srinatha named Srinatha Kavi  directed by Bapu was released in 1993 starring veteran actor N. T. Rama Rao, also popularly called as Nata Sarvabhoumudu, and Jayasudha.

Srinatha is a prominent character in the Telugu film Bhakta Potana produced by the Vauhini Studios in 1942. In the fim thespian V. Nagayya played the role of Bammera Potana, and Gowrinatha Sastry played the role of Srinatha as the brother-in-law of Potana.

See also

 Peddana, another famous composer of Prabandhas.

References

Bibliography
 
 

Indian male poets
Telugu people
Telugu poets
1360s births
1441 deaths
14th-century Indian poets
15th-century Indian poets
People of the Vijayanagara Empire
Biographical films about poets
Vijayanagara poets
Scholars of Vijayanagara Empire